Gorham Co. v. White, 81 U.S. (14 Wall.) 511 (1872), was a United States Supreme Court case in which the Court held it is not essential to identity of design that the appearance should be the same to the eye of an expert. If, to an ordinary observer, the resemblance is sufficiently deceptive as to induce him to purchase one, supposing it to be the other, then the one first patented is infringed by the other.

References

External links
 

1872 in United States case law
United States patent case law
United States Supreme Court cases
United States Supreme Court cases of the Chase Court